The Church of Pentecost is a Pentecostal denomination that originates from Ghana. The Church currently has a presence in more than 151 countries globally. Its current Chairman, who happens to be its highest officer worldwide, is Apostle Eric Nyamekye.

History
The church has its origins in a British mission of Rev. James McKeown (missionary) in Ghana in 1937. In 1953, The Church was founded as Gold Coast Apostolistic Church. Upon the country's attainment of independence in 1957, the name changed to the Ghana Apostolic Church. In resolution of a conflict with the Apostolic Church, Ghana, the then President of Ghana, Dr. Kwame Nkrumah ruled that the church adopted a new name, thus, in August 1962, the name Church of Pentecost came into being. Through foreign missionary work and establishing relationships with other Pentecostal churches, the Church of Pentecost expanded into a worldwide movement. The Church of Pentecost currently operates in 105 Nations headed by Apostles, Prophets, Evangelists and Senior Pastors throughout the world and about 21,802 local assemblies in 2,381 districts. In 2018, global membership of the Church stood at 3,257,943, with children constituting about 1,056,062. The Church of Pentecost had 137,862 church officers and 2,492 ordained ministers in 101 nations.

Church Leadership
Chairmen of the Church of Pentecost

Pastor James McKeown 1953–1982
Apostle Fred Stephen Safo 1982–1987
Prophet Martinson Kwadwo Yeboah 1988–1998
Apostle Dr. Michael Kwabena Ntumi 1998–2008
Apostle Prof. Opoku Onyinah 2008–2018
Apostle Eric Nyamekye 2018–Date

See also
World Evangelical Alliance
Believers' Church
Worship service (evangelicalism)

References

Bibliography
 An Introduction to Pentecostalism: Global Charismatic Christianity – Allen Anderson – 
 Religions of the World, Second Edition – J. Gordon Melton, Martin Baumann -

Protestantism in Africa
Protestantism in Ghana
Pentecostal denominations